Isaac Borquaye (born 13 June 1989), better known as Guvna B, is a rapper, author and broadcaster from Custom House, London. He has released 10 albums, 2 books and has produced segments for the BBC and a football pundit for Sky Sports News' Good Morning Transfers. He has also appeared on television and in schools to discuss topics that affect young people from underprivileged communities.

Biography 

Guvna B was born in London, England in June 1989, to Ghanaian parents from Accra. Looking back on growing up in Custom House, in East London, he stated "My upbringing helped me find my faith. The negative things I saw in my society inspired me to do better and inspire people to be the best they can be instead of becoming stereotypical products of a negative environment" He later graduated from University of Hertfordshire studying business and journalism

He has released ten albums and is the recipient of two MOBO Awards for Best Gospel Act, three Urban Music Awards for Best Gospel Act or Artist, and a Gospel Music Award for Best Gospel Artist. He was the first rapper to top the Official Christian and Gospel Charts for his 2013 album Odd1Out. His story was shared with many when he was featured in the 22 March 2013 issue of the music industry magazine Music Week in a feature covering the gospel music industry in the UK. 

In January 2013, Guvna B launched his own urban clothing brand, Allo Mate.

Unpopular Culture was published in 2017 by the Society for Promoting Christian Knowledge and Unspoken: Toxic Masculinity and How I Faced the Man Within the Man was published by Harper Inspire, an imprint of HarperCollins, in 2021 after his father's death to cancer.

He has presented documentaries on both radio and TV including BBC World Service's Gospel Meets Hip-Hop and BBC Radio 2's Keeping the Peace. He has appeared as a pundit on Sky Sports News' Good Morning Transfers, and as a guest on The Zoe Ball Breakfast show on BBC Radio 2.

Guvna B lives in Greenwich, Londonwith his wife and their son. He is a fan of West Ham United F.C.

Works

Discography 

 The Narrow Road (31 May 2008)
 Scrapbook (1 January 2011)
 Next Ting 140 (18 August 2011)
 Odd1Out (26 May 2013)
 Scrapbook II (31 March 2014)
 Something for the Summer (3 August 2014)
 Secret World (20 November 2015)
 Hands are Made for Working (18 May 2018)
 everywhere + nowhere (3 April 2020)

Bibliography

Awards and nominations

References

External links 

 
 

Living people
English male rappers
Grime music artists
People from Canning Town
Black British male rappers
British performers of Christian hip hop music
Urban contemporary gospel musicians
1989 births
Rappers from London